The Death of the Virgin Mary is a common subject in Western Christian art, the equivalent of the Dormition of the Theotokos in Eastern Orthodox art.  This depiction became less common as the doctrine of the Assumption gained support in the Roman Catholic Church from the Late Middle Ages  onward.  Although that doctrine avoids stating whether Mary was alive or dead when she was bodily taken up to Heaven, she is normally shown in art as alive.  Nothing is said in the Bible about the end of Mary's life, but a tradition dating back to at least the 5th century says the twelve Apostles were miraculously assembled from their far-flung missionary activity to be present at the death, and that is the scene normally depicted, with the apostles gathered round the bed.

A virtuoso engraving by Martin Schongauer of about 1470 shows the Virgin from the foot of a large bed with the apostles spread around the three sides, and this composition influences many later depictions. Earlier depictions usually follow the standard Byzantine image, with the Virgin lying on a bed or sarcophagus across the front of the picture space, with Christ usually standing above her on the far side, and the apostles and others gathered around.  Often Christ holds a small figure that may look like a baby, representing Mary's soul.

A prominent, and late, example of the subject is Death of the Virgin by Caravaggio (1606), the last major Catholic depiction.  Other examples include Death of the Virgin by Andrea Mantegna and Death of the Virgin by Hugo van der Goes.  All these show the gathering of the apostles around the deathbed, as does an etching by Rembrandt.

Three minor anonymous artists are known to art history as the Master of the Death of the Virgin.

References

Virgin Mary in art
Anglican Mariology
Christian art about death